The Mancotal Dam is an embankment dam on the Tuma River near Asturias in Jinotega Department, Nicaragua. It forms Lake Apanás, the largest reservoir in the country. The primary purpose of the dam is hydroelectric power generation and it supports the 50 MW Centro América Plant. The dam was completed and its first generator commissioned in 1964. The second generator was commissioned a year later on 18 March 1965. About  to the south west the penstock meets Centro América Plant where it turns two 25 MW Francis turbines. After generating power the water is then discharged into the Viejo River. To supplement levels in the Lake Apanás, the El Dorado Dam was completed in 1985 and forms Lake Asturias just downstream of the Mancotal Dam. Water from Lake Asturias can be pumped into Lake Apanás. In 1998 heavy rains from Hurricane Mitch severely damaged the Mancotal and El Dorado Dams, over-topping their spillways and nearly destroying the dams. The Virgen Dam downstream on the Viejo River was destroyed but later rebuilt.

See also

Virgen Dam – on the Viejo River.

References

Dams in Nicaragua
Hydroelectric power stations in Nicaragua
Dams completed in 1964
Energy infrastructure completed in 1965
Jinotega Department